Touch of Water is the fourth studio album by Australian recording artist James Blundell, released in August 1993 by EMI. The album debuted and peaked at number eleven on the ARIA Albums Chart.

At the 1994 ARIA Music Awards, the album was nominated for Best Adult Contemporary Album. At the 1994 Country Music Awards, the album won Top Selling album of the Year.

Track listing

Charts

Release history

References

James Blundell (singer) albums
1993 albums